Davilla is a genus of flowering plants belonging to the family Dilleniaceae. It has around 30 neotropical, species and is one of most diverse genera of lianas, vines, erect or scandent (climbing) shrubs.

Description
Davilla plants are classed as lianas or shrubs, and they are similar in form to that of species in Tetracera or Dillenia genus.
Although they can identified from other Dilleniaceae genera plants due to several features; having sepals unequal in size, with the two inner ones larger, becoming crustaceous (having a hard shell) and covering the fruit completely, a paniculate inflorescence and the fruit being a capsule.
They are hermaphroditic plants (or bisexual - bearing both male and female reproductive organs). It has leaves which are often scabrous (rough to the touch) and pubescent with simple trichomes (hairs or bristles). The petioles (leaf stalks) are winged to narrowly recurve-winged. The inflorescences panicles are terminal (at the end of branches) or axillary (at leaf junctions) in the upper nodes. The flower has 5 sepals, which are uneven. The 3 outer ones are small and 2 inners ones are larger. It has 3–6 petals, which are deciduous. 
It has numerous stamens and 1-2 carpels (female reproductive organ), which are capsular and contain 1 compartment. It has 2 ovules and erect and basal clavate (club-shaped) styles. It also has peltate (shield-like) and emarginate (notched at the apex) stigmas. The sepals later become leathery and begin enveloping the fruit, and simulating a globose shaped capsule. Inside the capsule, are 1-2 smooth seeds which are surrounded by an aril (a membranous or fleshy appendage).

Not much of the reproductive biology of the genus Davilla is known. Noting floral visitors, among reports concerning the genus Davilla, Ducke (1902) reported that bee species, Halictus  was visiting flowers of Davilla rugosa . For the same species, Kuhlmann & Kühn (1947) indicated bees and other insects were listed as pollinators. Croat (1978), then verified flowers of Davilla nitida  were being visited by (stingless bee species) Partamona cupira (Smith 1863).

Taxonomy
The genus name of Davilla is either named in honour of Pedro Franco Dávila (1711–1786), a Peruvian and Spanish naturalist and collector, or according to George Don in 1831, Henry Catherine Davilla (Enrico Caterino Davila) an Italian historian who died in 1599.

The genus was first published and described by Domenico Vandelli in Fl. Lusit. Brasil. Spec. collation 35 in 1788. It was then reprinted in Script. Pl. Hispan. (edited by J.J. Roemer), Vol.115 in 1796.

The type species is Davilla rugosa .

The taxonomy of the genus Davilla was revised in 2012.

Species known
According to Kew;

The genus is accepted by United States Department of Agriculture and the Agricultural Research Service, they accept 2 species; Davilla nitida (Vahl) Kubitzki and Davilla rugosa Poir.

Distribution and habitat
Its native range is between Mexico and tropical America. It is found in the countries of; Belize, Bolivia, Brazil, Colombia, Costa Rica, Cuba, Ecuador, French Guiana, Guatemala, Guyana, Honduras, Jamaica, Mexico, Nicaragua, Panamá, Paraguay, Peru, Suriname, Trinidad-Tobago and Venezuela.

The greatest Davilla species diversity is located in Brazil, up to 12 species can be found in the Atlantic Forest of Brazil.

Habitat
It is found in moist or wet forests, often in hilly pine forests. Also in forest clearings and borders.

Uses
Davilla elliptica and Davilla nitida as well as Alchornea glandulosa (a tree species), have properties that could be used in the treatment of peptic ulcers. The leaves of Davilla elliptica have been used in folk medicine to treat diseases such as inflammation and other ulcers.

Threats
Davilla glaziovii  is included on the red list of Brazil, due to habitat loss and predatory extractivism (the extracting natural resources).

References

Dilleniaceae
Eudicot genera
Plants described in 1796
Flora of South America